The Vehmsmoor is a nature reserve in North Germany. It is located in the borough of Walsrode within the district of Soltau-Fallingbostel in Lower Saxony. Its classification number is NSG LÜ 182.

Description

The Jordanbach, a tributary of the Böhme, drains the Vehmsmoor.

Peat was cut in the raised bog for centuries. Today it is covered by a birch-pine carr (Bruchwald). Some vegetation of a raised bog nature still exists, consisting mainly of cottongrass, cranberries, heather, sundew and, in the peat cuttings, peat moss. Moor grass dominates the area. The crane is breeding again in the area.

History 

On 25 May 1990 the Vehmsmoor was legally designated as a nature reserve. The district of Soltau-Fallingbostel is responsible for it as the subordinate conservation authority.

See also 
 Nature reserves in Lower Saxony

References

External links 
  Naturschutzgebiet "Vehmsmoor" - Information by the NLWKN 

Nature reserves in Lower Saxony
Heidekreis
Walsrode
BVehmsmoor
Bogs of Lower Saxony